The 1917–18 United States collegiate men's ice hockey season was the 24th season of collegiate ice hockey.

Regular season
Several programs suspended operations due to World War I. Most would return shortly after the war's end.

Standings

References

1917–18 NCAA Standings

External links
College Hockey Historical Archives

 
College